Bata (Gbwata) is an Afro-Asiatic language spoken in Nigeria in Adamawa State in the Numan, Song, Fufore and Mubi LGAs, and in Cameroon in North Province along the border with Nigeria. Dialects are Demsa, Garoua, Jirai, Kobotachi, Malabu, Ndeewe, Ribaw, Wadi, and Zumu (Jimo). It is often considered the same language as Bacama.

Names
Blench (2019) lists Bwatye (endonym: Ɓwaare; exonym: Bachama) as a closely related language variety. They are located in Adamawa State (Numan and Guyuk LGAs) and Kaduna State (northeast of Kaduna town). It is also called Kwā ɓwàryē.

ALCAM (2012) lists Gbwata (Bwaara in Nigeria) as the singular personal form of Bata. The speakers refer to their language as "the language of the Gbwata", called Magbwatá, Magbwati or Magbwatiye in Cameroon.

Dialects
In Cameroon, there are three varieties of Gbwata:

Demsa (Demsa commune in Bénoué department, which is on the Nigerian border, 30 km northeast of Garoua)
Kokoumi (Garoua commune, Bénoué department, which is along the Benue River)
Faro (Jelepo in Beka commune, Faro department)

Ndeewe is the dialect of the Gbwata who live far from the banks of the Faro and Benue rivers, where the "agricultural Bata" live. It is now spoken by only a few dozen people.

Bacama is a Gbwata ethnic group settled in Nigeria.

There are 2,500 speakers in Cameroon.

Notes

External links
Bata materials from Raymond Boyd

Biu-Mandara languages
Languages of Cameroon
Languages of Nigeria